Kirk is an unincorporated community in Klamath County, Oregon, United States. It was named for Methodist minister Jesse Kirk as well as a train station in the area. Its post office operated from 1920 to 1948.

References

Unincorporated communities in Klamath County, Oregon
1920 establishments in Oregon
Unincorporated communities in Oregon